A. C. Greene (born Alvin Carl Greene Jr.; 4 Nov 1923 – 5 April 2002) was an American writer – important in Texas literary matters as a memoirist, fiction writer, historian, poet, and influential book critic in Dallas.  As a newspaper journalist, he had been a book critic and editor of the Editorial Page for the Dallas Times Herald when John F. Kennedy was assassinated, which galvanized his role at the paper to help untangle and lift a demoralized city in search of its soul.  Leaving full-time journalism in 1968, Greene went on to become a prolific author of books, notably on Texas lore and history. His notoriety led to stints on radio and TV as a talk-show host.  By the 1980s, his commentaries were being published by major media across the country.  He had become a sought-after source for Texas history, anecdotes, cultural perspective, facts, humor, books, and politics.  When the 1984 Republican National Convention was held in Dallas, Greene granted sixty-three interviews about Texas topics to major media journalists.  Greene's 1990 book, Taking Heart – which examines the experiences of the first patient in a new heart transplant center (himself) – made The New York Times Editors Choice list.

Career 

In 1948, Greene began working as a cub reporter for the Abilene Reporter-News and wrote book reviews and articles for the entertainment section.  From 1952 to 1957, Greene owned and operated the Abilene Book Store, located at 365 Cypress Street, across the street from the Paramount Theater – its slogan: "The Book Center of West Texas."  In 1957, he began teaching journalism at Hardin-Simmons University.

Greene, in his teens, was known as "A. C." So, in 1953, he legally changed his name from Alvin Carl to A. C. and dropped the Jr.

In 1960, Greene became a book editor for the Dallas Times Herald; and in 1963, the Times Herald promoted him to the editor of the Editorial Page, a role he performed until 1965.  Of the Kennedy assassination, Greene wrote:

Greene left the Times Herald in 1968 to pursue a Ph.D. at the University of Texas at Austin and to devote more time to writing books. From 1968 to 1969, Greene was the executive editor of the Southwestern Historical Quarterly, a publication of the Texas State Historical Association. In 1969, he served as President of the Texas Institute of Letters while working on his doctorate at The University of Texas at Austin.

In 1968, Greene was awarded a Dobie-Paisano Fellowship from the University of Texas at Austin which included a six-month stay at Paisano, a ranch 14 miles southwest of Austin purchased by J. Frank Dobie for use as a writer's retreat.  The award and retreat led to Greene's first book, A Personal Country.

In the 1980s, Greene wrote a weekly column on Texas history for the Dallas Morning News.

From 1986 to 1992, Greene served as Founding Coordinating Director of the Center for Texas Studies at the University of North Texas in Denton.  He retired as emeritus director.  James Ward Lee, Ph.D. (born 1931) – an author, professor of English at North Texas since 1958, former chairman of the English Department, and co-director of the center – called Greene "The Dean of Texas Letters."

Annually, Greene's hometown of Abilene, Texas presents the A.C. Greene Award to a distinguished Texas author for lifetime achievement during the West Texas Book Festival. Past winners include John Graves, Sandra Brown, Elmer Kelton, Liz Carpenter, John Erickson, and many others.

Family and growing up
Greene gave much credit for his love of reading, writing, and storytelling to his maternal grandmother, Maude E. Cole (1879–1961). Besides being a writer and poet, she was also an amateur painter.  She was a prize-winning and published poet and author, and from 1926 to 1946, a librarian at the Carnegie Library in Abilene, Texas.  She was a pioneer in the Texas literary scene.  Maude was born Maude Elfie Craghead in 1879 in Youngsport, Texas. Later, she changed her name from Elfie to Elizabeth and used Maude E. Cole as her name for the rest of her life and, in 1921, became a widow of Ambrose Hutchinson Cole (1872–1921). She remarried in 1945 to Henry Alden Tileston (1871–1952).  Maude, known to the family as "Mibby", regularly took A. C. Greene to the library for full days while she worked.  Greene claims that the library had been his babysitter.

Maude's mother, Mary Catherine Dockray Craghead Longley, had become a widow of John Lytle Craghead in 1888 and remarried Campbell Longley (1816–1907), a veteran of the Texas Revolution and father of three sons by a previous marriage, one of whom was gunman Bill Longley.

A. C. was married twice, first in 1950 to Betty Jo Dozier (1925–1989).  They had three sons and a daughter: Geoffrey Carl, Mark Cole (1955–2005), Eliot Bruce, and Meredith Elizabeth.

Greene's parents – Alvin Carl Greene Sr. (born in Wills Point, Texas, in 1902), and Johnnie Marie Cole (born in Beaumont, Teas, in 1906) – were killed in 1964 in a two-vehicle accident while traveling from Beaumont to Dallas (after visiting their son David Greene and his new wife, Mary Welch, in New Orleans). Their car had been hit by an 18-wheel truck doing 80 mph on U.S. 69, five miles south of Rusk, Texas. A. C. and David had a brother John Lytle, but he had died  months of age in 1935.

In 1989, Greene's wife Betty died from cancer.  He subsequently remarried Judy Dalton Hyland (née Julia Hall Dalton; 1933–2012), who in 1979 had divorced John Walton Hyland, M.D.  Judy was the daughter of the former governor of Missouri, John Montgomery Dalton.  Through that marriage, he gained two stepdaughters: Julia "Julie" Elizabeth Hyland and Leslie Catherine Hyland.  Judy died 8 August 2012 in Austin.

Selected published works

Books (1st editions)

Literary criticism by Greene

Poetry

Stage plays, screenplays and opera
The last captive: A Screenplay Manuscript (1991) 
A Cherished Design: The Creation of the University of Texas (1981)
The Santa Claus Bank Robbery: A Screenplay (1989)

Oral histories
 Transcript: Dallas Mayors Oral history Project, No. 7, co-authored with Alan Mason, Oral History Program, East Texas State University

Selected articles
 Upwardly Mogul: Move Over, Hollywood. Make Way for Joe Camp. Joe Camp? Texas Monthly November 1976 pps. 141–145

Manuscripts and papers 
 A.C. Greene Papers, 1964–1997, bulk 1993–1994 University of Texas at Arlington Library
 A.C. Greene Papers 1967–1969, 1973 Southwestern Writers Collection The Wittliff Collections (Bill Wittliff was publisher of Encino Press) Albert B. Alkek Library Texas State University, San Marcos

Awards and honors

Texas Institute of Arts and Letters
 1964 – Inducted as a member
 1964 – Co-winner, Stanley Walker Award for Best Newspaper Writing: No Life Is Lived Without Influence, The Dallas Times Herald
 1969 – Fellow, Texas Institute of Letters & recipient of the Dobie Paisano Fellowship while studying at The University of Texas at Austin
 1973 – Friends of the Dallas Public Library Award for Book Offering Most Significant Contribution to Knowledge: The Santa Clause Bank Robbery
 1974 – Co-winner, Texas Collectors Institute Award for Best Book Design: A Christmas Tree, by A. C. Greene, illustrated by Ancell Nunn, designed by William D. Wittliff
 1974 – Co-winner, Texas Collectors Institute Award for Best Book Design: Dallas, the Deciding Years, A Historical Portrait, by A. C. Greene, designed by William D. Wittliff
 1987 – Lon Tinkle Award, for a distinguished career in letters associated with the State of Texas

Other awards and honors

 1964 – Honoree as editor of the editorial page of the Dallas Times Herald and book editor, 12th Annual Southwest Journalism Forum, Press Club of Dallas Foundation, and the Southern Methodist University Department of Journalism
 1990 – Fellow, Texas State Historical Association
 The University of North Texas Press, has a series of books named The A. C. Greene Series named in his honor for books on Texas and the Southwest
 A. C. Greene Award been presented annually in September 2001 to a distinguished Texas author for lifetime achievement. It is a feather of the West Texas Book Festival and is sponsored by Friends of the Abilene Public Library, the Abilene Reporter-News, and the Scripps Howard Foundation.
 Chautauqua Award for lifetime achievement in preserving history, Dallas County Heritage Society
 1998 – Lifetime Achievement Award, Texas Book Festival, hosted by Laura Bush

Formal education 
 1940 – Graduated from Abilene High School
 Attended Phillips University
 1948 – Bachelor of Arts, Abilene Christian University
 1968 – Did post-grad work at The University of Texas at Austin, towards a PhD

References 
General references
Talking with Texas Writers: Twelve Interviews by Patrick Bennett (interviews with Larry McMurty), A. C. Greene, John Graves, et al., Texas A&M University Press (1980) 
Biography Index: A Cumulative Index to Biographical Material in Books and Magazines, H.W. Wilson Company, New YorkVol. 17: September 1990—August 1992 (1992)  Vol. 29: September 2003—August 2004 (2004)
Contemporary Authors: A Bio-Bibliographical Guide to Current Writers in Fiction, General Nonfiction, Poetry, Journalism, Drama, Motion Pictures, Television, and Other Fields, Gale Research, DetroitVolumes 37–40, 1st revision (1979)  New Revision Series: Volume 14 (1985)  New Revision Series: Volume 92 (2001) 

Inline citations

External links 
 

1923 births
2002 deaths
American columnists
American male journalists
American opera librettists
20th-century American historians
American male non-fiction writers
Historians of Texas
Abilene High School (Abilene, Texas) alumni
Abilene Christian University alumni
University of North Texas faculty
People from Abilene, Texas
People from Dallas
Western (genre) writers
20th-century dramatists and playwrights
Journalists from Texas
20th-century American male writers
20th-century American journalists
Historians from Texas